Sir James Brian Unwin  (born 21 September 1935) is a former British civil servant and an author.  He was chairman of the board of HM Customs and Excise and president of the European Investment Bank. He is also an author of historical non-fiction.

Education and career 
James Brian Unwin studied at New College, Oxford and Yale University.

He joined the British Civil Service in 1960, initially working for the Commonwealth Relations Office. From 1968 he was at HM Treasury, seconded from 1981 to 1987 to the Cabinet Office. There he eventually held the post of Deputy Secretary.  
He was chairman  of the board of HM Customs and Excise (1987–1993) and became president of the European Investment Bank in 1993, a position which he held until his retirement in 1999.

He has served as president of the European Centre for Nature Conservation and as a member of the board of directors of English National Opera.

Authorship
Unwin has published two works of historical non-fiction, both dealing with the Napoleonic era: Terrible Exile: The Last Days of Napoleon on St Helena (2010), which was shortlisted for the Fondation Napoléon History Prize,  and A Tale in Two Cities: Fanny Burney and Adèle, Comtesse de Boigne (2014). In 2016, Unwin published a memoir of his time in the civil service titled 'With respect, minister'.

Honours
On 13 June 1986, Unwin was appointed Commander of the Order of the Bath (CB). On 5 June 1990, he was promoted to Knight Commander of the same Order (KCB) with the 1990 Birthday Honours.

References

External links
 Brian Unwin speaking during the launch of the book 'The EU Fiscal Crisis: Forcing Eurozone Political Union in 2011?' by Graham Bishop

Living people
British civil servants
British non-fiction writers
Knights Commander of the Order of the Bath
1935 births
British male writers
Presidents of the European Investment Bank
British officials of the European Union
Male non-fiction writers
Civil servants in the Commonwealth Relations Office